Kallarkutty Dam is a dam built on the Muthirapuzha river, a tributary of the Periyar River, as part of the Neryamangalam Hydroelectric Project at Kallarkutty in Vellathooval Panchayath, Idukki District, Kerala. The water discharged from the Chenkulam Dam's powerhouse and the Muthirapuzha river is diverted to the Neryamangalam Powerhouse near Panamkutty above the Lower Periyar Dam. The Hydroelectric Project was commissioned on 27 January 1961 to generate 45 MW of power using 3 turbines with a capacity of 15 MW. In 2006, the project was upgraded from 45 MW to 52.65 MW. Taluks through which release flow are Udumpanchola, Devikulam, Idukki, Kothamangalam, Muvattupuzha, Kunnathunadu, Aluva, Kodungalloor and Paravur.

Specifications
Latitude : 9⁰ 58′ 48" N
Longitude: 77⁰ 00′ 05" E
Panchayath : Vellathooval
Village : Vellathooval
District : Idukki 
River Basin : Mudirapuzha
River : Mudirapuzha
 Release from Dam to river  : Mudirapuzha
Year of completion : 1961 
Type of Dam : Masonry- gravity
 Classification : HH ( High Height)
Maximum Water Level (MWL) : EL 456.90 m 
Full Reservoir Level ( FRL) : EL 456.90 m
Storage at FRL : 6.8 Mm3
Height from deepest foundation : 43.00 m
 Length : 182.88 m
 Spillway : Ogee type- 5 Nos. radial gates, each of size 10.97 x 6.4 m

Reservoir
The Kallarkutty dam is the recipient of flows from both arms of the Muthirapuzha sub-basin. The reservoir thus formed is spread about 0.648 sqkm and has 6.88 million cubic meter capacity. Kallarkutty reservoir hosts Boating and other hydel tourism activities.

References

Periyar (river)
Dams in Kerala
Dams in Idukki district